RV Tauri (RV Tau) is a star in the constellation Taurus. It is a yellow supergiant and is the prototype of a class of pulsating variables known as RV Tauri variables.

Variability
RV Tau was discovered to be variable in 1905 by Lydia Ceraski, and by 1907 it was clear that it had minima of alternating brightness. Over a period of 78.5 days it shows two maxima at around magnitude 9.5, a minimum around magnitude 10.0, and another minimum about 0.5 magnitudes fainter. This change in brightness is caused by pulsations: the temperature and radius vary, causing some variation in luminosity but mostly a shift of the emitted radiation from visual to infrared. The spectral type varies in line with the temperature, being classified as G2 at its brightest and M2 at its dimmest.  In addition to the fundamental period given, RV Tauri also shows variations in its mean brightness over a period of about 1,200 days, a characteristic which defines the subclass RVb.  The maxima and minima in each period vary by several tenths of a magnitude with no obvious regularity.

Binary system
RV Tauri is a single-lined spectroscopic binary. The period of 1,198 days corresponds to the long-term variations in the mean brightness of the system. These are caused by changing obscuration of the primary star by a circumstellar disc. The companion is thought to be more massive than the variable primary star, but it cannot be detected in the spectrum and it is likely to be a red dwarf. The disc surrounds both stars at a distance of about five astronomical units (AU).

Visibility
RV Tau is well placed for northern hemisphere observers during the winter months, and observations can be made from August to April.  However it is faint, located in a nondescript patch of sky between The Pleiades and Beta Aurigae.

Properties
The distance to RV Tau has been calculated by various methods, including modelling the atmosphere. RV Tauri stars have been shown to follow a period-luminosity relationship, and this can be used to confirm the luminosity and distance. They have low masses, but are extended cool stars of high luminosity undergoing strong mass loss. RV Tau has a luminosity of  but a spectral luminosity class of bright supergiant (Ia), indicating the rarified nature of its atmosphere.

Surface abundances show enhancement of some heavy elements, fusion products thought to have been dredged up during an earlier AGB phase.  Carbon in particular is strongly in excess in RV Tau.  However, its overall metallicity is lower than the Sun's.

Evolution
RV Tau is likely a post-asymptotic giant branch (AGB) star, an originally sun-like star which is in the end stages of its life just prior to the expulsion of a planetary nebula and contraction to a white dwarf.  RV Tau gives an insight into the lives and deaths of stars like the Sun.  Evolution models show it takes about 10 billion years for a 1 solar mass star to reach the Asymptotic Giant Branch.

References

External links
 
 AAVSO observations of RV Tauri
 RV Tauri — The strange prototype of a strange class

Taurus (constellation)
RV Tauri variables
G-type supergiants
K-type supergiants
M-type supergiants
Tauri, RV
283868
BD+25 732
IRAS catalogue objects
J04470673+2610455